Thank You is a greatest hits collection released by the American alternative rock band Stone Temple Pilots on November 11, 2003 on Atlantic Records. The album has sold over 500,000 copies.

Overview
Thank You features most of the band's singles.

There are two versions of the compilation, one that only contains a music CD and another that also features a DVD with live performances, bootlegs (including a performance of the Aerosmith song "Sweet Emotion" with Steven Tyler and Joe Perry), and music videos spanning the band's career.

Thank You was called "nearly perfect" by AllMusic's Stephen Erlewine, who wrote that "STP made music that sounded great at the time and even better now" and that the band's music had "stood the test of time." Rolling Stone gave the compilation album 4 out of 5 stars.

Big Bang Babies
An earlier greatest hits album, to be titled Big Bang Babies, was planned for an October 2000 release.  In addition to twelve of the band's biggest numbers, the album was to feature four new songs, including "Heed the Water Whisperer", "The Way She Moves" and "You Can't Drive Me Away". STP planned to record the new material in New York with producer Brendan O'Brien in mid-2000.

Track listing

Personnel
 Eric Kretz – drums
 Robert DeLeo – bass
 Scott Weiland – vocals
 Dean DeLeo – guitar

Certifications

References

Stone Temple Pilots compilation albums
2003 greatest hits albums
Albums produced by Brendan O'Brien (record producer)
Albums produced by Dean DeLeo
Albums produced by Robert DeLeo
Atlantic Records compilation albums